Bert Morris may refer to:

Bert D. Morris Jr., actor
Bert Morris (footballer)
Bert Morris, character in Berlin, Appointment for the Spies

See also
Albert Morris (disambiguation) 
Robert Morris (disambiguation)
Herbert Morris (disambiguation)